Heaven's Mentality is the debut album from the popular Christian hip hop group the Cross Movement, released on April 28, 1997. Although there are just four men on the cover the Cross Movement crew is listed in the insert as: The Ambassador, Cruz Cordero, Enock, Gift (Tonic + Earthquake), Phanatik, Prodigy and Tru-Life.

Music video
A music video was made for the song "Cypha Time".

Track listing
Blood Spilla’
Test It
Father Forgive Them
Who’s Da Man
Catch 22
Heaven’s Mentality
Dust
Shock!
Lower Case gods
El Elyon
Solo Christo
Cypha’ Time
The Love Letter (Bonus Track)

External links
 "Cypha Time" Music Video

1997 debut albums
The Cross Movement albums
Cross Movement Records albums